Grandy is an unincorporated community and census-designated place (CDP) in Currituck County, North Carolina, USA. It was first listed as a CDP in the 2020 census with a population of 2,776. It is located along US 158 between the Currituck Sound (on the east) and the North River (on the west).

It is the location of the Weeping Radish Farm and Brewery. Weeping Radish was shown on Diners, Drive-Ins and Dives.

The former Grandy School was listed on the National Register of Historic Places in 1998.

Demographics

2020 census

Note: the US Census treats Hispanic/Latino as an ethnic category. This table excludes Latinos from the racial categories and assigns them to a separate category. Hispanics/Latinos can be of any race.

References

Populated places in Currituck County, North Carolina
Populated places in North Carolina
Populated coastal places in North Carolina
Census-designated places in Currituck County, North Carolina
Census-designated places in North Carolina